Jerrel Douglas Wilson (October 4, 1941 – April 9, 2005) was an American professional football player who was a punter for 16 seasons, 15 of them with the Kansas City Chiefs, in the American Football League (AFL) and the National Football League (NFL). Wilson played college football at the University of Southern Mississippi. Nicknamed Thunderfoot, he was selected to three AFL All-Star Teams and three AFC-NFC Pro Bowls. Wilson was elected to the Chiefs Hall of Fame in 1988. He was drafted in the 17th round (225th overall) of the 1963 NFL Draft by the Los Angeles Rams and in the 11th round (88th overall) of the 1963 AFL Draft by the Chiefs.

His punts were high, booming shots that arched far down the field, potent weapons in the war for field position.  Wilson seemed to have the explosiveness of dynamite in his foot, hence the more-than-appropriate nickname of "Thunderfoot." The Southern Mississippi alum was the Chiefs' punter for a team record 15 seasons and is considered one of the best ever to play in the game.

Selected in the 11th round of Kansas City's much heralded 1963 AFL Draft that brought in Hall of Fame members Buck Buchanan and Bobby Bell and fellow Chiefs Hall of Famer Ed Budde. Wilson is tied with fellow punter Dustin Colquitt for longest tenured players in franchise history. He retired with multiple team records including a franchise-record 1,014 punts during his career, highest average yardage in a career with 43.6, in a season with 46.1, in a game with 56.5. Wilson owns the NFL record for most seasons leading the league in punting average with four, leading in 1965, 1968, 1972 and 1973.

Hall of Fame head coach Hank Stram said that Wilson "made other people aware of how important the kicking game was at a time when special teams were not given special consideration.  I'm prejudiced, but he's the best punter I ever saw.  He'll go down in history as the best kicker in the NFL."

Wilson had four career punts of over 70 yards, which included a league leading 72-yard boot in his rookie year.  He was named to three Pro Bowl teams in three consecutive years from 1970 to 1972.  Wilson was also a reserve running back for the Chiefs and early in his career, accumulating 53 yards on 22 carries spread out over seven seasons.  To close his career, Wilson played the 1978 season for the New England Patriots.

Wilson said, regarding his punting style, "The way I attack the football, every time I hit it, I try to bust it, unless I'm around the 50.  Then I hit it high.  Basically, my power comes from everything.  I try to snap everything I have in my body, my hips, knees, everything."

Wilson died of cancer on April 9, 2005, in Bronson, Texas.

In December 2019, Wilson was named as a finalist in the Specialists category of the NFL 100 All-Time Team celebrating the best players of the first 100 years of the league.

References

1941 births
2005 deaths
American football running backs
American football punters
Kansas City Chiefs players
New England Patriots players
Pearl River Wildcats football players
Southern Miss Golden Eagles football players
American Conference Pro Bowl players
American Football League All-Star players
American Football League All-Time Team
Sportspeople from Mobile, Alabama
Players of American football from Alabama
Players of American football from New Orleans
Deaths from cancer in Louisiana
American Football League players